Stanoje Simić (29 July 1893 – 26 February 1970) was a Serbian lawyer, politician and diplomat who was the SFR Yugoslav Minister of Foreign Affairs and the Ambassador to the United States.

References

1893 births
1970 deaths
Foreign ministers of Yugoslavia
Ambassadors of Yugoslavia to the United States
League of Communists of Yugoslavia politicians
Politicians from Belgrade
Lawyers from Belgrade
Diplomats from Belgrade
University of Belgrade Faculty of Law alumni
Burials at Belgrade New Cemetery
20th-century Serbian lawyers
Grand Crosses of the Order of the White Lion